James “Jim” Ferguson Skea CBE FRSE   (born 1 September 1953) is a British academic and currently Professor of Sustainable Energy at Imperial College London. He is Co-Chair of Working Group III of the Intergovernmental Panel on Climate Change. He was a founding member of the UK Government's Committee on Climate Change and currently chairs Scotland's Just Transition Commission. He was a co-author of the Intergovernmental Panel on Climate Change (IPCC) 2018 Special Report on Global Warming of 1.5 °C.

Education
Skea studied at the University of Edinburgh, where he graduated with a BSc in Mathematical Physics with first class Honours in 1975. He gained his PhD in Energy Research from Clare College, Cambridge in 1978

Academic career
From 1978 to 1981, Skea was a research assistant in the Cavendish Laboratory at the University of Cambridge. He then worked at the Department of Engineering and Public Policy at Carnegie-Mellon University in Pittsburgh, Pennsylvania, as a research associate and later visiting assistant professor from 1981 to 1983. He was employed at the Science Policy Research Unit at the University of Sussex as a Research Fellow (1983–1989), Senior Research Fellow (1989–1993) and a Professorial Fellow (1994–1998). Skea was Director of the Policy Studies Institute from 1998 to 2004. He has held an appointment as Professor of Sustainable Energy at Imperial College London’s Centre for Environmental Policy since 2009.

Intergovernmental Panel on Climate Change
Skea has been involved with the Intergovernmental Panel on Climate Change (IPCC) since it was created in the 1990s. He has served as a member of the Bureau since 2008, first as Vice-Chair of Working Group III, and then as Co-Chair from 2015. He was a co-author of the 2018 Special Report on Global Warming of 1.5 °C., 2019 Special Report on Climate Change and Land and the 2022 report on the Mitigation of Climate Change.

Scientific appointments
Skea was appointed as Director of the Economic and Social Research Council's Global Environmental Change Programme from 1995 to 1998. He was Research Director at the UK Energy Research Centre from 2004 to 2012. Skea was a member of the United Kingdom’s Committee on Climate Change from its inception in 2008 until 2018. From 2012 to 2017 he was the Research Councils UK Energy Strategy Fellow based at Imperial College London. Skea was President of the Energy Institute from 2015 to 2017 and has been an Engineering and Physical Sciences Research Council Senior Fellow since 2017.

Honours and awards
Fellow of the Royal Society of Arts, 2000
Officer of the Order of the British Empire, 2004
Fellow of the Energy Institute, 2005
Certificate of Commendation, Japan, 2009, for work as co-chair of Japan-UK Joint Research Project "Roadmap to a Low-Carbon World"
Honorary Fellow of the Society of Engineers, 2011
Melchett Award of the Energy Institute, 2010
Commander of the Order of the British Empire, 2013

Selected publications

Notes

External links
Professor Jim Skea webpage on Imperial College London website
Professor Jim Skea webpage on Intergovernmental Panel on Climate Change website

1953 births
Alumni of Clare College, Cambridge
Commanders of the Order of the British Empire
Members of the Order of the British Empire
People educated at Grove Academy
Living people